The 2016 MEAC men's basketball tournament will take place March 8–12, 2016 at the Norfolk Scope in Norfolk, Virginia The champion will receive the conference's automatic bid to the 2016 NCAA tournament.

Seeds 
The top 12 teams were eligible for the tournament, Florida A&M is ineligible for postseason play due to APR Sanctions.

Teams were seeded by record within the conference, with a tiebreaker system to seed teams with identical conference records.

Schedule

Bracket

* denotes overtime period

References

2015–16 Mid-Eastern Athletic Conference men's basketball season
MEAC men's basketball tournament
2016 in sports in Virginia
Basketball competitions in Norfolk, Virginia
College basketball tournaments in Virginia